Christmas with Patti Page - not to be confused with the 1965 Columbia Records album of the same name - is a Patti Page LP album, first issued by Mercury Records in 1951 as catalog number MG-25109, and later reissued and expanded with four additional tracks in 1955 as catalog number MG-20093.

Later CD incarnations have been expanded with further bonus tracks culled from non-album singles, radio broadcasts, and television performances.

Track listing

Original 1951 Mercury LP (MG 25109)
 "Jingle Bells" – 2:26
 "Silent Night" – 2:58
 "Christmas Choir" – 2:44
 "The First Noel" – 2:39
 "Christmas Bells" – 2:34
 "White Christmas" – 3:21
 "Santa Claus Is Comin' to Town" – 2:43
 "The Christmas Song" – 3:29

1955 Mercury LP (MG 20093)
 "Jingle Bells" – 2:26
 "Silent Night" – 2:58
 "Christmas Choir" – 2:44
 "The First Noel" – 2:39
 "Christmas Bells" – 2:34
 "White Christmas" – 3:21
 "Santa Claus Is Coming to Town" – 2:43
 "The Christmas Song" – 3:29
 "Pretty Snowflakes" – 2:15
 "I Want to Go Skating with Willie" – 2:11
 "Where Did My Snowman Go" – 2:33
 "The Mama Doll Song" – 2:42

1995 PolyGram CD (528373)
 "Jingle Bells" – 2:26
 "Silent Night" – 2:58
 "Christmas Choir" – 2:44
 "The First Noel" – 2:39
 "Christmas Bells" – 2:34
 "White Christmas" – 3:21
 "Santa Claus Is Coming to Town" – 2:43
 "The Christmas Song" – 3:29
 "Pretty Snowflakes" – 2:15
 "I Want to Go Skating with Willie" – 2:11
 "Where Did My Snowman Go" – 2:33
 "The Mama Doll Song" – 2:42
 "Boogie Woogie Santa Claus" (Mercury Single, 1950) - 2:14

2013 Real Gone Music Deluxe Edition CD (RGM 0200)
 "Jingle Bells" – 2:26
 "Silent Night" – 2:58
 "Christmas Choir" – 2:44
 "The First Noel" – 2:39
 "Christmas Bells" – 2:34
 "White Christmas" – 3:21
 "Santa Claus Is Coming to Town" – 2:43
 "The Christmas Song" – 3:29
 "Pretty Snowflakes" – 2:15
 "I Want to Go Skating with Willie" – 2:11
 "Where Did My Snowman Go" – 2:33
 "The Mama Doll Song" – 2:42
 "Boogie Woogie Santa Claus" (Mercury Single, 1950) - 2:14
 "Little Donkey" (Mercury Single, 1959) - 2:14
 "Home for the Holidays" (from The Patti Page Show, 1955) - 1:36
 "Christmas Greeting from Patti" (Radio Spot) - :09
 "The Christmas Song" (from The Patti Page Show, 1955) - 2:13
 "Silent Night" (from The Patti Page Show, 1955) - 2:08

Personnel 

Steven Fallone – Digital Remastering
Bob Frank – Executive Producer
Patti Page – Vocals
Carmelo Roman – Art Direction

References

Patti Page albums
1955 Christmas albums
Christmas albums by American artists
Mercury Records albums
Covers albums
Pop Christmas albums